Arthur Hayley (second ¼ 1854 — first ¼ 1947) was an English rugby union footballer who played in the 1880s. He played at representative level for Yorkshire, and at club level for Wakefield Trinity (were a rugby union club at the time, so no Heritage № is allocated). Prior to Tuesday 27 August 1895, Wakefield Trinity was a rugby union club.

Background
Arthur Hayley's birth was registered in Wakefield district, West Riding of Yorkshire, and his death aged 92 was registered in Wakefield district, West Riding of Yorkshire.

Change of Code
When Wakefield Trinity converted from the rugby union code to the rugby league code on Tuesday 27 August 1895, Arthur Hayley would have been 41 years of age. Subsequently, he didn't become both a rugby union and rugby league footballer for Wakefield Trinity.

Genealogical information
Arthur Hayley was the older brother of Harry Hayley.

References

External links

Search for "Hayley" at espnscrum.com
Search for "Hayley" at rugbyleagueproject.org

1854 births
1947 deaths
English rugby union players
Rugby union players from Wakefield
Wakefield Trinity players
Yorkshire County RFU players